Keith Gerard Taylor (born December 21, 1964) is a former American football safety in the National Football League for the Indianapolis Colts, the New Orleans Saints, and the Washington Redskins.  He played college football at the University of Illinois and was drafted in the fifth round of the 1988 NFL Draft.  Taylor played high school football at Pennsauken High School in New Jersey and is the younger brother of John Taylor who was also played in the NFL as a wide receiver for the San Francisco 49ers.

References 

1964 births
Living people
Pennsauken High School alumni
People from Pennsauken Township, New Jersey
American football safeties
Illinois Fighting Illini football players
Indianapolis Colts players
New Orleans Saints players
Washington Redskins players
Ed Block Courage Award recipients